Shahabad is a town nearby Hardoi city and a municipal board in Hardoi district in the Indian state of Uttar Pradesh. At one point of time it was counted among the few biggest cities of Oudh, but declined rapidly in later period and now reduced to a town. It is the site of the Tomb of Diler Khan, a governor in the time of Shah Jahahan and Aurangzeb.There is a renowned coaching center named Al-Amaan Study center.

As of 2011, the population of Shahabad is 80,226, in 13,958 households. It is the seat of a tehsil and a community development block. Important local industries include carpet weaving, building materials, and dairy products.

History

According to a tradition recorded by Joseph Tiefenthaler in the 1700s, Shahabad occupied the site of a former village called Angadpur, after its founder Angad, the nephew of Rama. Modern Shahabad was founded in 1677 by one Nawab Diler Khan, a Pathan officer in the Mughal army, who had been sent to quell an uprising in Shahjahanpur. He overthrew the Pande Parwars of Angni Khera (which, according to H.R. Nevill, is probably the correct form of Tiefenthaler's "Angadpur") and was in turn granted their territory as a jagir, upon which he then founded Shahabad.

Diler Khan populated the new city of Shahabad with fellow Pathan kinsmen and soldiers, and many of the neighbourhoods of the city today bear the names of his followers. He built a brick palace at the centre of town, called the Bari Deorhi, which Tiefenthaler described upon his visit in 1770 as being "strengthened by towers like a fortress, with a vestibule and a covered colonnade." The palace no longer exists, although the two grand gateways are still standing. Diler Khan also built the city's Jama Masjid as well as his own mausoleum. Both of them are built out of dressed kankar blocks. The mausoleum's upper story contains bands of florid decoration in red stone, a style common to architecture of that period which can also be seen in the complex surrounding the Taj Mahal in Agra. He also built a grand pond near the mausoleum, known as Narbada.

Shahabad declined rapidly during the late 1700s, as Mughal power waned and was replaced in this region by the Nawabs of Awadh. Already by 1799, William Tennant described it as being in ruins. In 1824, Reginald Heber, Bishop of Calcutta, traveled to Shahabad and described it as a "considerable town or almost city with the remains of fortifications and many large houses."

The descendants of Nawab Diler Khan Daudzai also moved to a nearby area which under the zamindari and named this place as Wazirabad which is now known as village HARRAI, comes under Tehsil Shahbad, District Hardoi.

Geography 
It has an average elevation of 143 metres (469 feet).

Demographics
As of 2011 Indian Census, Shahabad had a total population of 80,226, of which 42,635 were males and 37,591 were females. Population within the age group of 0 to 6 years was 11,102. The total number of literates in Shahabad was 44,078, which constituted 54.9% of the population with male literacy of 60.6% and female literacy of 48.5%. The effective literacy rate of 7+ population of Shahabad was 63.8%, of which male literacy rate was 70.3% and female literacy rate was 56.3%. The Scheduled Castes and Scheduled Tribes population was 6,558 and 9 respectively. Shahabad had 13958 households in 2011.

Villages 
Shahabad CD block has the following 170 villages:

References

External links 
 

Fatehpur Gayand

Cities and towns in Hardoi district